Huang Liang (20 March 1954 – after 1999) was a male Chinese international table tennis player.

Career
He won three medals at the 1977 World Table Tennis Championships; a bronze medal in the men's singles a silver medal in the men's doubles with Lu Yuansheng and a gold medal in the Swaythling Cup (men's team event) for China.

Two years later he won a silver at the 1979 World Table Tennis Championships in the Swaythling Cup (men's team) and in 1981 won a bronze medal at the 1981 World Table Tennis Championships with Pu Qijuan in the mixed doubles.

He worked in Italy in the 1990s, and was diagnosed of esophagus cancer in 1997. When his health deteriorated, his family brought him back to Henan Cancer Hospital in Zhengzhou for treatment in December 1999.

See also
 List of table tennis players
 List of World Table Tennis Championships medalists

References

1954 births
Chinese male table tennis players
Table tennis players from Henan
People from Yanshi
Year of death uncertain
World Table Tennis Championships medalists
Sportspeople from Luoyang
Year of death missing